Majed Belal (born 6 September 1983) is a Saudi football player.

References
http://www.slstat.com/spl2010-2011ar/player.php?id=244

1983 births
Living people
Saudi Arabian footballers
Al-Riyadh SC players
Najran SC players
Al-Wehda Club (Mecca) players
Jeddah Club players
Al-Hazem F.C. players
Al-Ansar FC (Medina) players
Al-Kawkab FC players
Al-Hejaz Club players
Saudi First Division League players
Saudi Professional League players
Saudi Second Division players
Association football defenders